Engine Company No. 25 is a historic firehouse located at 3203 Martin Luther King Jr., Ave SE, in Congress Heights, Washington, District of Columbia.

History
It was built in 1901 and, starting in 1903, served by Chemical  Company 5, which served in areas where water hydrants were not yet available.  Its original equipment was a 1903 American LaFrance double tank 170 gallon chemical engine. 
In July 1913 Company 5 was disbanded and Engine Company 25 occupied the firehouse. Its original equipment was a 1913 Ahrens Fox 700 GPM motor pumper.

Two of the stations firefighters have been killed in the line of duty. Private Edward F. Laughton on March 2, 1927, and Private Lloyd A. Irwin on December 4, 1947.

In 2007 the firehouse was listed by the National Register of Historic Places as part of the Firehouses in Washington D.C. Multiple Property Submission.

Dispatches from Eng. Co. 25
April 19, 1981 The Washington Post Magazine completed a full magazine spread about the rich history and heroic actions performed by the men of Engine Company 25. In 1980, Engine company 25 was the busiest company in the District with 2,533 alarms.

Past engines
1903 American La France
1913 Ahrens Fox
2000 Seagrave (S-135)
2006 Seagrave Marauder II (S-167)
2014 Pierce Arrow (S-190)

References

External links
Photos at Facebook

Congress Heights
Fire stations completed in 1901
Fire stations on the National Register of Historic Places in Washington, D.C.